Southgate is a city in Wayne County in the U.S. state of Michigan.  The population was 30,047 at the 2020 census.  Southgate was incorporated as a city in October 1958, which was one of the last remaining portions of the now-defunct Ecorse Township.  It is part of the Downriver collection of communities south of the city of Detroit.

History
Pierre Michel Campau was the first white settler in Southgate. He moved into the area in 1795, which subsequently became a farming community. Other people from the Detroit area at the Rouge and Detroit Rivers followed him to Southgate.

Historically a rural area of Ecorse Township, the areas within present-day Southgate were originally platted with street grids beginning in the 1920s - though most developments did not start until just after World War II. Among the oldest residential areas in the city is the Old Homestead neighborhood, on the east side.

There are two accounts of the city's name: Southgate is described in local guides as being the "South Gate" or entrance to the Metro Detroit area.  "A metropolitan daily picture story" in late 1956 also gave this explanation.

Southgate's first mayor, Thomas J. Anderson, also stated in 1956 that the name originated from the newly built Southgate Shopping Center at the southeast corner of Eureka & Trenton roads. "We were trying to get a separate post office for our community, and were advised that it would help our cause if the township board passed a resolution creating an unincorporated village," Anderson explained.  "The name Southgate was chosen because of the shopping center then under consideration, and the board agreed that it was an appropriate name. Anderson had previously suggested the city be named Southgate due to its location south of Detroit. Anderson became aware of South Gate, California near Los Angeles during World War II while temporarily stationed in San Diego.  The resolution was adopted at a regular meeting in the early summer of 1953."

Thomas Anderson became the first mayor in 1958 after being Ecorse Township's supervisor for the previous five years. Southgate Anderson High School was named after him in 1982.

Geography
Southgate borders the cities of Riverview (south), Wyandotte (east), Allen Park (northwest), Taylor (west), and Lincoln Park (north), as well as Brownstown Charter Township (southwest).

Transportation

Highways
 runs south–north through the northwest corner of the city.
 was the designation for Dix-Toledo Highway between 1930 and 1967.  Afterward, it ran as a concurrency with I-75 until its decommissioning in 1973.
, known locally as Fort Street, runs south–north and forms most of the eastern boundary of the city with Wyandotte.

Rail
The Conrail Shared Assets Lincoln Secondary, used primarily by CSX Transportation freight trains that run between Detroit and Toledo, Ohio, runs through the northwest corner of Southgate and is notable for the large grade crossing (one of the largest in the world) through the intersection of Northline and Allen Roads, and also has a crossing at Reeck Road.

Public transportation
Three Suburban Mobility Authority for Regional Transportation bus routes pass through the city of Southgate, providing service seven days a week.

Demographics

2010 census
As of the census of 2010, there were 30,047 people, 13,062 households, and 7,833 families residing in the city. The racial makeup of the city was 88.7% White, 5.5% African American, 0.5% Native American, 1.6% Asian, 1.7% from other races, and 2.0% from two or more races. Hispanic or Latino of any race were 6.5% of the population.

There were 13,062 households, of which 27.4% had children under the age of 18 living with them, 42.6% were married couples living together, 12.3% had a female householder with no husband present, 5.0% had a male householder with no wife present, and 40.0% were non-families. 33.9% of all households were made up of individuals, and 14.1% had someone living alone who was 65 years of age or older. The average household size was 2.29 and the average family size was 2.95.

The median age in the city was 40.8 years. 20.3% of residents were under the age of 18; 9.1% were between the ages of 18 and 24; 26.2% were from 25 to 44; 28.2% were from 45 to 64; and 16.3% were 65 years of age or older. The gender makeup of the city was 47.9% male and 52.3% female.

2000 census
As of the census of 2000, there were 30,136 people, 12,836 households, and 8,048 families residing in the city. The racial makeup of the city was 93.66% White, 2.11% African American, 0.50% Native American, 1.67% Asian, 0.04% Pacific Islander, 0.85% from other races, and 1.18% from two or more races. Hispanic or Latino of any race were 3.98% of the population.

There were 12,836 households, out of which 26.7% had children under the age of 18 living with them, 49.2% were married couples living together, 9.7% had a female householder with no husband present, and 37.3% were non-families. 32.3% of all households were made up of individuals, and 14.1% had someone living alone who was 65 years of age or older.  The average household size was 2.33 and the average family size was 2.98.

In the city, the population was spread out, with 21.5% under the age of 18, 8.3% from 18 to 24, 30.6% from 25 to 44, 23.3% from 45 to 64, and 16.2% who were 65 years of age or older.  The median age was 38 years. For every 100 females, there were 93.0 males.

The median income for a household in the city was $46,927, and the median income for a family was $56,710. Males had a median income of $45,829 versus $28,549 for females. The per capita income for the city was $23,219.  About 2.6% of families and 4.6% of the population were below the poverty line, including 3.4% of those under age 18 and 8.5% of those age 65 or over.

Economy

Southgate currently houses the headquarters of The News-Herald, a local Downriver newspaper which covers over twenty surrounding communities. During the late 1950s and 1960s, The Southgate Sentinel, a Mellus newspaper and forerunner to the present-day News-Herald, was published. Southgate is also served by regional newspapers The Downriver Sunday Times, Detroit Free Press and The Detroit News, as well as by Detroit's radio and television outlets. The primary cable service provider in Southgate is Comcast and has been since 1980 when it was known as Wayne Cablevision and owned by Maclean Hunter, later adopting the Maclean Hunter name before selling the system to Comcast in 1994, however, it is also served by Wide Open West and AT&T U-verse.

Southgate is the home of the Southgate Civic Center and the Southgate Fun & Fitness Centre YMCA at Interstate 75 and Northline Road.

The Southgate Shopping Center, which opened in 1957, is located at Eureka and Trenton Roads. Planet Fitness and Downriver Gymnastics serve as anchors, as does the MJR Southgate Digital Cinema 20, which has served Southgate and the surrounding area since opening on November 6, 1998. In addition, Southgate is home to many other retailers, which include a Meijer supercenter, a Walmart supercenter, Lowe's, Downriver's only Kroger Marketplace, Downriver's only Sam's Club, Dunham's Sports, Big Lots and TJMaxx, among others. Southgate also had a Super Kmart, which closed on October 12, 2014, due to Kmart's continuing financial struggle; as well as a Toys "R" Us, which closed on June 27, 2018, due to the company's financial struggles.

Notable people

Rick Down, former Major League Baseball coach
Jeff Jones, former Major League Baseball pitcher and coach
Jeff Kaiser, former Major League Baseball pitcher
Ashley Qualls, internet business entrepreneur
Marcie Bolen, Von Bondies Rock and Roll garage band

Education

Primary and secondary schools

Public schools
Southgate Community School District operates public schools.
Grogan Elementary
Fordline Elementary
Shelters Elementary
Allen Elementary
Davidson Middle School
Southgate Anderson High School

Private schools
Christ the King Lutheran (Preschool - 8th Grade)
St. Pius X (Preschool - 8th Grade) - The groundbreaking for the school building, then with eight rooms, occurred on August 13, 1953. The school itself opened in September 1950. The new building was dedicated on September 15, 1954 and officially opened that year. The school was originally known as St. Pius V Catholic School, a name which differed from that of its parish, but the two names were harmonized in 1974 as some people were unaware the two were connected.
Montessori Center of Downriver (Preschool - Kindergarten)
Creative Montessori Academy (Preschool - 8th Grade)
Nanny's Nursery School and Day-Care Center (Pre-School - Kindergarten)
Kindercare Learning Center (Pre-School - Kindergarten)

Colleges and universities
Dorsey Schools (Southgate Campus)
Madonna University (Downriver Campus)
Northwood University (Southgate Campus)

References

External links

Southgate Schools

 
Cities in Wayne County, Michigan
Metro Detroit
1958 establishments in Michigan
Populated places established in 1958